Local elections were held in Manila on May 13, 2013, within the Philippine general election. The voters elected for the elective local posts in the city: the mayor, vice mayor, the six congressmen, and the councilors, six in each of the city's six legislative districts.

Mayor Alfredo Lim ran for the mayorship for the third consecutive time; if he won, he would have been prohibited to run in 2016 due to term limits. Lim's opponent was former senator, vice president, deposed president then convicted plunderer and defeated 2010 presidential candidate, Joseph Estrada, who was a longtime San Juan mayor; in order to run for the mayorship, Estrada had to transfer his residence from San Juan to Manila. The two formerly contested the presidency in 1998, with Estrada emerging victorious.

Estrada's running mate was Vice Mayor Isko Moreno, who has served since 2007; had he won, he would be term-limited in 2016. Actor and 6th District Councilor Lou Veloso was Lim's running mate; Veloso was the councilor elected with the highest percentage of votes in 2010.

Mayoral and vice mayoral election
On May 4, 2012, Vice Mayor Isko Moreno joined the Pwersa ng Masang Pilipino party, fueling speculations that he would be former President Joseph Estrada's running mate. Estrada would confirm this on May 9, 2012, but, for one term only. On May 7, 2012, Incumbent Mayor Alfredo Lim announced he will run for re-election and said that Moreno was his original running mate.

A year prior to the election, Estrada transferred  his residence from San Juan to Santa Mesa, Manila; this was made official by the Manila City Hall. Estrada's Manila home was formerly the headquarters of President Ramon Magsaysay during the 1953 presidential election.

On September 18, 2012, Lim announced that he has picked 6th District Councilor Lou Veloso to be his running mate. Lim noted that Veloso is the councilor that emerged with the most votes in the last local elections.

On October 1, 2012, during the first day of filing of certificate of candidacies, Lim and Veloso, along with their ticket's 36 city council bets, filed their certificate of candidacies at the Commission on Elections (COMELEC) field office in Arroceros, Manila. Lim is supported by all but one of the incumbent congressmen of Manila - Benjamin Asilo of the 1st District, Carlo Lopez of the 2nd District, Zenaida Angping of the 3rd District, Trisha Bonoan-David of the 4th District, and Sandy Ocampo of the 6th District. 5th District Representative Amado Bagatsing originally supported him but endorsed Estrada instead. Lim also said that his 2013 campaign will be his last as he intends to retire from politics in 2016. He had previously served as mayor from 1992 to 1998, Secretary of the Interior and Local Government under Estrada from 2000 to 2001, lost the mayorship to Estrada ally Lito Atienza in 2001, elected Senator in 2004 under the Estrada-backed Koalisyon ng Nagkakaisang Pilipino, and retook the mayorship from Atienza's  son Ali  in 2007, then successfully defending it against Atienza himself in 2010.

A day later, Estrada and Moreno filed their certificate of candidacies. Estrada left his home at Santa Mesa with Moreno aboard his jeepney he made famous during the 1998 presidential election. Estrada drove the jeepney to the COMELEC office at Arroceros; the United Nationalist Alliance-backed Estrada ticket includes 29 of the incumbent 36 councilors. The contest between Lim and Estrada has been billed by many as "Dirty Harry vs. Asiong Salonga", with Lim being previously referred to as "Dirty Harry", and Estrada having played Asiong Salonga in a movie.

Aside from Lim and Estrada, other candidates include Marino Magallanes, a fortune teller from Quiapo, mechanical engineer and perennial candidate Onofre Abad, lawyer Felix Cantal, Samuel Gabot, Rodolfo Lim and driver Fidel Cruz.

On January 7, 2013, the Sandiganbayan ruled to dismiss via technicality a petition disqualifying Estrada from running due to a condition from his pardon granted by President Gloria Macapagal Arroyo that said he would not seek elective office. However, he faced other disqualification cases from the same issue at the Commission on Elections and at the Regional Trial Court.

On January 16, the commission disqualified all of the mayoral candidates, save for Estrada and Lim, and declared them as "nuisance candidates."

The two camps signed a covenant for peaceful elections at the Manila Police District headquarters on February 15, 2013. Commission on Elections chairman Sixto Brillantes and Parish Pastoral Council for Responsible Voting chairman Henrietta de Villa witnessed the signing, which were also attended by the rest of the slates, including their running mates. A day later, the police arrested Moreno and five other UNA candidates for the city council for alleged illegal gambling. Estrada later said he may file charges against the police who arrested his running mate. The police arrested the group after they proceeded to hold a bingo game, which the police had said to be illegal, after promising they would hold a raffle instead. Moreno and the other candidates were freed after the Manila Prosecutor's Office ruled that there was not enough evidence to prolong their detention. Moreno maintained that the bingo game is not illegal after President Ferdinand Marcos classified it as a parlor game. Brillantes later said that Moreno's group did not violate any election law when they held a bingo game as the campaign period for local elections has not yet started.

The Manila Regional Trial Court dismissed another disqualification case against Estrada on March 4. Judge Marivic Umali heeded Estrada's lawyer Frank Chavez that the Commission on Elections and not the court had jurisdiction on the case. On April 1, the commission dismissed Estrada's last disqualification case.

Opinion polling

Mayoral election

Three-candidate race

Two-candidate race

Results

Mayoral election
Parties are as stated in their certificate of candidacies.

Vice Mayoral election
Parties are as stated in their certificate of candidacies.

House of Representatives elections

1st District
Benjamin Asilo is the incumbent.

2nd District
Carlo Lopez is the incumbent.

3rd District
Zenaida Angping is the incumbent. She is a common candidate of the LP-KKK and UNA tickets.

The Commission on Elections disqualified James Jaime Marquez Tan from the election for being a "nuisance candidate".

4th District
Incumbent Trisha Bonoan-David is running unopposed. Like Zenaida Angping, she is also a common candidate of LP-KKK and UNA.

5th District
Amado Bagatsing is the incumbent.

6th District
Rosenda Ocampo is the incumbent and her main opponent is former Congressman Benny Abante.

City Council elections
Each of Manila's six legislative districts sends six councilors to the City Council. The election is via plurality-at-large voting: A voter can vote up to six candidates; the six candidates with the highest number of votes in a particular district are elected.

In addition, the barangay captains and the Sangguniang Kabataan (SK) chairpersons  in the city's barangays (communities) elect amongst themselves a president that will seat as an ex officio member of the city council with full voting powers. The presidents of the barangay captains and SK chairpersons that were elected after the 2010 barangay elections will serve until the winners of the 2013 barangay elections are seated in late November.

In case of a tie vote, the vice mayor, as the presiding officer, will vote to break the tie.

Summary

1st District
It is composed of Tondo.

 
 
 
 
 
 
|-
|colspan=5 bgcolor=black|
 
 
 
 
 

 
 
 
 
 
 
 
 

Raffy Jimenez Crespo, son of former representative Mark Jimenez, was disqualified from this election.

Cristy Lim is a guest candidate of the LP-KKK coalition.

2nd District
Gagalangin area which is also part of Tondo.

 
 
 
 
 
 
|-
|colspan=5 bgcolor=black|

3rd District
It composed of Binondo, Quiapo, San Nicolas and Santa Cruz

 
 
 
 
 
 
|-
|colspan=5 bgcolor=black|

4th District
It is situated in Sampaloc. No. 6 Arlene Chua's term was cut short because of citizenship issues and was declared ineligible for office by COMELEC. 7th placer Krystle Bacani assumed office on March 17, 2015.

 
 
 
 
 
 
|-
|colspan=5 bgcolor=black|

5th District

 
  
 
 
 
 
|-
|colspan=5 bgcolor=black|

6th District

 
 
 
 
 
 
|-
|colspan=5 bgcolor=black|
 
 
 
 
 
 
 
 
 
 
 
 
 
 
 

Joel Par is a guest candidate of UNA.

References

Manila
Elections in Manila
Politics of Manila
2013 elections in Metro Manila